Orestida is a municipality in the Kastoria regional unit, Greece. The seat of the municipality is in Argos Orestiko.

The town of Argos Orestiko hosts the celebration of the ascension of the Holy Cross, in September. This is one of the biggest festivals of the regional unit of Kastoria.

Municipality
The municipality Orestida was formed at the 2011 local government reform by the merger of the following 2 former municipalities, that became municipal units:
Argos Orestiko
Ion Dragoumis

External links
Official website (in Greek)

References

Municipalities of Western Macedonia
Populated places in Kastoria (regional unit)